General elections were held in Japan on 10 December 1972. The result was a victory for the Liberal Democratic Party, which won 271 of the 491 seats. Voter turnout was 71.76%.

Results

By prefecture

References

Japan
General election
General elections in Japan
Japanese general election
Election and referendum articles with incomplete results